Adrian Mole: The Wilderness Years is the fourth book in the Adrian Mole series, written by Sue Townsend. It focuses on the worries of the now-adult Mole. The book was first published in 1993 by Methuen. It is set in 1991 to the first part of 1992 and Adrian is 23¾ years of age.

The book covers the same themes as the first volumes and continues the regular format of a diary.

The book charts the progress of Adrian's wavering love life; he begins infatuated, as ever, with Pandora Braithwaite, with whom he is sharing a flat in Oxford (although as her boyfriend Jack Cavendish also lives there, chances of romance are slim). His chasing after Pandora finally ends when she finds Adrian's list of ways of torturing her current partner and recommends a psychotherapist, Leonora de Witt, with whom Adrian is immediately smitten. Leonora fends off all of Adrian's attempts to get to know her better, and indirectly leads him to his next love, Bianca, an engineer from London. His relationship with Bianca is fully enjoyable and looks promising until she runs off with his mother's husband, Martin (also an engineer). However, he soon meets Jo Jo, a worker at Savage's, a horrible Soho restaurant where he found employment.

The last passages of the book are written from Greece, on a cruise which doubles as a writer's course. Adrian is thrilled to learn that "the book without language", a concept he touched upon in his otherwise terrible novel in progress, Lo! The Flat Hills Of My Homeland, caught the attention of Angela Hacker, who has recommended him to an agent.

Throughout the novel, Adrian suffers his usual litany of humiliations, including becoming host to childhood nemesis Barry Kent upon Kent's release from prison. In short order, Barry becomes Oxford's latest literary darling, while Adrian toils away at his little read novels.

One recurring feature in the series is that books will tend to have a happy ending that has to be temporary for another book to focus on Adrian's troubles. This book is focused on his low self-esteem, career failures, and loneliness, but with writing success, happy romance and loss of all his worries at the end, it is certainly the happiest ending of any of the books in the series. However, at the beginning of the next book, set years later after the longest gap between entries in the series, he has divorced Jo Jo and descended back into his usual frustration.

Selected editions 

 Methuen Publishing Company, hardback, 1993 (hardback). .
 Arrow Books, 1994 (paperback). .
 Penguin Books, 2003 (paperback). .

1993 British novels
Fictional diaries
Wilderness Years
Methuen Publishing books